The arrondissement of Arras is an arrondissement of France in the Pas-de-Calais department in the Hauts-de-France region. It has 357 communes.

Composition

The communes of the arrondissement of Arras, and their INSEE codes, are:

 Ablainzevelle (62002)
 Achicourt (62004)
 Achiet-le-Grand (62005)
 Achiet-le-Petit (62006)
 Acq (62007)
 Adinfer (62009)
 Agnez-lès-Duisans (62011)
 Agnières (62012)
 Agny (62013)
 Ambrines (62027)
 Amplier (62030)
 Anvin (62036)
 Anzin-Saint-Aubin (62037)
 Arleux-en-Gohelle (62039)
 Arras (62041)
 Athies (62042)
 Aubigny-en-Artois (62045)
 Aubrometz (62047)
 Aumerval (62058)
 Auxi-le-Château (62060)
 Averdoingt (62061)
 Avesnes-le-Comte (62063)
 Avesnes-lès-Bapaume (62064)
 Ayette (62068)
 Bailleul-aux-Cornailles (62070)
 Bailleul-lès-Pernes (62071)
 Bailleulmont (62072)
 Bailleul-Sir-Berthoult (62073)
 Bailleulval (62074)
 Bancourt (62079)
 Bapaume (62080)
 Baralle (62081)
 Barastre (62082)
 Barly (62084)
 Basseux (62085)
 Bavincourt (62086)
 Beaudricourt (62091)
 Beaufort-Blavincourt (62092)
 Beaulencourt (62093)
 Beaumetz-lès-Cambrai (62096)
 Beaumetz-lès-Loges (62097)
 Beaurains (62099)
 Beauvoir-Wavans (62881)
 Beauvois (62101)
 Béhagnies (62103)
 Bellonne (62106)
 Bergueneuse (62109)
 Berlencourt-le-Cauroy (62111)
 Berles-au-Bois (62112)
 Berles-Monchel (62113)
 Bermicourt (62114)
 Berneville (62115)
 Bertincourt (62117)
 Béthonsart (62118)
 Beugnâtre (62121)
 Beugny (62122)
 Biache-Saint-Vaast (62128)
 Biefvillers-lès-Bapaume (62129)
 Bienvillers-au-Bois (62130)
 Bihucourt (62131)
 Blairville (62135)
 Blangerval-Blangermont (62137)
 Boffles (62143)
 Boiry-Becquerelle (62144)
 Boiry-Notre-Dame (62145)
 Boiry-Sainte-Rictrude (62147)
 Boiry-Saint-Martin (62146)
 Boisleux-au-Mont (62151)
 Boisleux-Saint-Marc (62152)
 Bonnières (62154)
 Boubers-sur-Canche (62158)
 Bouret-sur-Canche (62163)
 Bourlon (62164)
 Bours (62166)
 Boyaval (62171)
 Boyelles (62172)
 Brebières (62173)
 Brias (62180)
 Bucquoy (62181)
 Buire-au-Bois (62182)
 Buissy (62184)
 Bullecourt (62185)
 Buneville (62187)
 Bus (62189)
 Cagnicourt (62192)
 Camblain-l'Abbé (62199)
 Cambligneul (62198)
 Canettemont (62208)
 Capelle-Fermont (62211)
 La Cauchie (62216)
 Chelers (62221)
 Chérisy (62223)
 Conchy-sur-Canche (62234)
 Conteville-en-Ternois (62238)
 Corbehem (62240)
 Couin (62242)
 Coullemont (62243)
 Courcelles-le-Comte (62248)
 Couturelle (62253)
 Croisette (62258)
 Croisilles (62259)
 Croix-en-Ternois (62260)
 Dainville (62263)
 Denier (62266)
 Douchy-lès-Ayette (62272)
 Duisans (62279)
 Dury (62280)
 Écoivres (62283)
 Écourt-Saint-Quentin (62284)
 Écoust-Saint-Mein (62285)
 Écurie (62290)
 Épinoy (62298)
 Eps (62299)
 Équirre (62301)
 Érin (62303)
 Ervillers (62306)
 Estrée-Wamin (62316)
 Étaing (62317)
 Éterpigny (62319)
 Étrun (62320)
 Famechon (62322)
 Fampoux (62323)
 Farbus (62324)
 Favreuil (62326)
 Feuchy (62331)
 Ficheux (62332)
 Fiefs (62333)
 Flers (62337)
 Fleury (62339)
 Floringhem (62340)
 Foncquevillers (62341)
 Fontaine-lès-Boulans (62342)
 Fontaine-lès-Croisilles (62343)
 Fontaine-lès-Hermans (62344)
 Fontaine-l'Étalon (62345)
 Fortel-en-Artois (62346)
 Fosseux (62347)
 Foufflin-Ricametz (62348)
 Framecourt (62352)
 Frémicourt (62353)
 Fresnes-lès-Montauban (62355)
 Fresnoy-en-Gohelle (62358)
 Frévent (62361)
 Frévillers (62362)
 Frévin-Capelle (62363)
 Gauchin-Verloingt (62367)
 Gaudiempré (62368)
 Gavrelle (62369)
 Gennes-Ivergny (62370)
 Givenchy-le-Noble (62372)
 Gomiécourt (62374)
 Gommecourt (62375)
 Gouves (62378)
 Gouy-en-Artois (62379)
 Gouy-en-Ternois (62381)
 Gouy-sous-Bellonne (62383)
 Graincourt-lès-Havrincourt (62384)
 Grand-Rullecourt (62385)
 Grévillers (62387)
 Grincourt-lès-Pas (62389)
 Guémappe (62392)
 Guinecourt (62396)
 Habarcq (62399)
 Halloy (62404)
 Hamblain-les-Prés (62405)
 Hamelincourt (62406)
 Hannescamps (62409)
 Haplincourt (62410)
 Haravesnes (62411)
 Haucourt (62414)
 Haute-Avesnes (62415)
 Hautecloque (62416)
 Hauteville (62418)
 Havrincourt (62421)
 Hébuterne (62422)
 Hendecourt-lès-Cagnicourt (62424)
 Hendecourt-lès-Ransart (62425)
 Héninel (62426)
 Hénin-sur-Cojeul (62428)
 Hénu (62430)
 Héricourt (62433)
 La Herlière (62434)
 Herlincourt (62435)
 Herlin-le-Sec (62436)
 Hermaville (62438)
 Hermies (62440)
 Hernicourt (62442)
 Hestrus (62450)
 Heuchin (62451)
 Houvin-Houvigneul (62459)
 Huclier (62462)
 Humbercamps (62465)
 Humerœuille (62467)
 Humières (62468)
 Inchy-en-Artois (62469)
 Ivergny (62475)
 Izel-lès-Équerchin (62476)
 Izel-lès-Hameau (62477)
 Lagnicourt-Marcel (62484)
 Lattre-Saint-Quentin (62490)
 Lebucquière (62493)
 Léchelle (62494)
 Liencourt (62507)
 Lignereuil (62511)
 Ligny-Saint-Flochel (62514)
 Ligny-sur-Canche (62513)
 Ligny-Thilloy (62515)
 Linzeux (62518)
 Lisbourg (62519)
 Magnicourt-en-Comte (62536)
 Magnicourt-sur-Canche (62537)
 Maisnil (62539)
 Maizières (62542)
 Manin (62544)
 Marest (62553)
 Marœuil (62557)
 Marquay (62558)
 Marquion (62559)
 Martinpuich (62561)
 Mercatel (62568)
 Metz-en-Couture (62572)
 Mingoval (62574)
 Moncheaux-lès-Frévent (62576)
 Monchel-sur-Canche (62577)
 Monchiet (62578)
 Monchy-au-Bois (62579)
 Monchy-Breton (62580)
 Monchy-Cayeux (62581)
 Monchy-le-Preux (62582)
 Mondicourt (62583)
 Montenescourt (62586)
 Mont-Saint-Éloi (62589)
 Monts-en-Ternois (62590)
 Morchies (62591)
 Morval (62593)
 Mory (62594)
 Moyenneville (62597)
 Nédon (62600)
 Nédonchel (62601)
 Neuville-au-Cornet (62607)
 Neuville-Bourjonval (62608)
 Neuville-Saint-Vaast (62609)
 Neuville-Vitasse (62611)
 Neuvireuil (62612)
 Nœux-lès-Auxi (62616)
 Noreuil (62619)
 Noyelles-sous-Bellonne (62627)
 Noyellette (62629)
 Noyelle-Vion (62630)
 Nuncq-Hautecôte (62631)
 Œuf-en-Ternois (62633)
 Oisy-le-Verger (62638)
 Oppy (62639)
 Orville (62640)
 Ostreville (62641)
 Palluel (62646)
 Pas-en-Artois (62649)
 Pelves (62650)
 Penin (62651)
 Pernes (62652)
 Pierremont (62655)
 Plouvain (62660)
 Pommera (62663)
 Pommier (62664)
 Le Ponchel (62665)
 Prédefin (62668)
 Pressy (62669)
 Pronville-en-Artois (62671)
 Puisieux (62672)
 Quéant (62673)
 Quiéry-la-Motte (62680)
 Quœux-Haut-Maînil (62683)
 Ramecourt (62686)
 Ransart (62689)
 Rebreuve-sur-Canche (62694)
 Rebreuviette (62695)
 Récourt (62697)
 Rémy (62703)
 Riencourt-lès-Bapaume (62708)
 Riencourt-lès-Cagnicourt (62709)
 Rivière (62712)
 Roclincourt (62714)
 Rocquigny (62715)
 Roëllecourt (62717)
 Rœux (62718)
 Rougefay (62722)
 Rumaucourt (62728)
 Ruyaulcourt (62731)
 Sachin (62732)
 Sailly-au-Bois (62733)
 Sailly-en-Ostrevent (62734)
 Sains-lès-Marquion (62739)
 Sains-lès-Pernes (62740)
 Saint-Amand (62741)
 Sainte-Catherine (62744)
 Saint-Laurent-Blangy (62753)
 Saint-Léger (62754)
 Saint-Martin-sur-Cojeul (62761)
 Saint-Michel-sur-Ternoise (62763)
 Saint-Nicolas (62764)
 Saint-Pol-sur-Ternoise (62767)
 Sapignies (62776)
 Le Sars (62777)
 Sars-le-Bois (62778)
 Sarton (62779)
 Sauchy-Cauchy (62780)
 Sauchy-Lestrée (62781)
 Saudemont (62782)
 Saulty (62784)
 Savy-Berlette (62785)
 Séricourt (62791)
 Sibiville (62795)
 Simencourt (62796)
 Siracourt (62797)
 Sombrin (62798)
 Souastre (62800)
 Le Souich (62802)
 Sus-Saint-Léger (62804)
 Tangry (62805)
 Teneur (62808)
 Ternas (62809)
 Thélus (62810)
 La Thieuloye (62813)
 Thièvres (62814)
 Tilloy-lès-Hermaville (62816)
 Tilloy-lès-Mofflaines (62817)
 Tilly-Capelle (62818)
 Tincques (62820)
 Tollent (62822)
 Tortequesne (62825)
 Le Transloy (62829)
 Trescault (62830)
 Troisvaux (62831)
 Vacquerie-le-Boucq (62833)
 Valhuon (62835)
 Vaulx (62838)
 Vaulx-Vraucourt (62839)
 Vélu (62840)
 Villers-au-Flos (62855)
 Villers-Brûlin (62856)
 Villers-Châtel (62857)
 Villers-lès-Cagnicourt (62858)
 Villers-l'Hôpital (62859)
 Villers-Sir-Simon (62860)
 Vis-en-Artois (62864)
 Vitry-en-Artois (62865)
 Wailly (62869)
 Wancourt (62873)
 Wanquetin (62874)
 Warlencourt-Eaucourt (62876)
 Warlincourt-lès-Pas (62877)
 Warlus (62878)
 Warluzel (62879)
 Wavrans-sur-Ternoise (62883)
 Willencourt (62891)
 Willerval (62892)
 Ytres (62909)

History

The arrondissement of Arras was created in 1800. In January 2007 it lost the canton of Le Parcq to the arrondissement of Montreuil, and the two cantons of Avion and Rouvroy to the arrondissement of Lens. At the January 2017 reorganisation of the arrondissements of Pas-de-Calais, it lost three communes to the arrondissement of Béthune and eight communes to the arrondissement of Lens.

As a result of the reorganisation of the cantons of France which came into effect in 2015, the borders of the cantons are no longer related to the borders of the arrondissements. The cantons of the arrondissement of Arras were, as of January 2015:

 Arras-Nord
 Arras-Ouest
 Arras-Sud
 Aubigny-en-Artois
 Auxi-le-Château
 Avesnes-le-Comte
 Bapaume
 Beaumetz-lès-Loges
 Bertincourt
 Croisilles
 Dainville
 Heuchin
 Marquion
 Pas-en-Artois
 Saint-Pol-sur-Ternoise
 Vimy
 Vitry-en-Artois

References

Arras